= Langford Lovell Price =

English economist

Langford Lovell Price (1862–1950) was an English economist, born in London. He was educated at Trinity College, Oxford, became fellow and treasurer of Oriel in 1888, and was Newmarch lecturer in statistics at University College London in 1895–96. In 1897 he was governor of Dulwich College and in 1898 was appointed an examiner in the "Moral Sciences Tripos" at Cambridge.

== Writings ==
Price's writings include:

- Industrial Peace (1897)
- A Short History of Political Economy in England (1891; second edition, 1896)
- Money and its Relation to Prices (1896; third edition, 1909)
- Economic Science and Practice (1896)
- A Short History of English Commerce and Industry (1900)
- The Position and Prospects of the Study of Economic History (1908)
- Co-operation and Co-partnership (1913)
